= MK-7240 =

Humanized monoclonal antibody

MK-7240 (formerly PRA-023) is a humanized monoclonal antibody developed for ulcerative colitis and Crohn's disease. Before the company was acquired by Merck for $10.8 billion, it was developed by Prometheus Biosciences.
